Coralliophila kaiparaensis is an extinct species of sea snail, a marine gastropod mollusk, in the family Muricidae, the murex snails or rock snails.

Distribution
This species occurs in New Zealand.

References

kaiparaensis
Gastropods described in 1918